"Sin Ti... Sin Mi" is a song written by Guatemalan singer-songwriter Ricardo Arjona for his eleventh studio album, 5to Piso (2008). The song was released as the second single from the album.

Music video 
The music video for "Sin Ti... Sin Mi" was filmed on the Argentinian Boxing Federation on Buenos Aires. It was directed by Joaquín Cambre.

On the video, which counted with more than 150 extras and 20 hours of filming, Arjona is seen as the "expectant narrator of the story." Actors Juan Pablo Raba and Sabrina García appear on the music video.

Trackslisting

Charts
"Sin Ti... Sin Mi" became a commercial success for Arjona. The song reached No.4 on both the Billboard Latin Songs and the Latin Pop Songs charts. It wasn't as successful as its predecessor, "Como Duele", which managed to reach No.2 on the Latin Songs chart, and No.1 on the Latin Pop Songs chart. On the year end charts, "Sin Ti... Sin Mi" was the 43rd best-performing single of 2009 on the Latin Songs chart, and 16th best-performing single on the Latin Pop Songs chart.

Weekly charts

Yearly charts

Release history

References 

2009 songs
Ricardo Arjona songs
Songs written by Ricardo Arjona